Ilya is a given name.

Ilya or ILYA may also refer to:
2968 Iliya, an asteroid
Ilya, Belarus, a village
Ilya (band), from Bristol, England
ILYA, British comics artist
"Ilya", a song by Martina Topley-Bird from her 2003 album Quixotic

See also
Elia (disambiguation)
Ilia (disambiguation)
Ilija (disambiguation)
Ilja
Ilyin
Ilyinka
Ilyino
Ilyinsky (disambiguation)